The House of Grey is an ancient English noble family from Creully in Normandy. The founder of the House of Grey was Anchetil de Greye, a Norman chevalier and vassal of William FitzOsbern, 1st Earl of Hereford, one of the few proven companions of William the Conqueror known to have fought at the Battle of Hastings in 1066.

The Greys were first ennobled in the 13th century as Barons Grey of Codnor, of Ruthyn and of Wilton, and they were later elevated as viscounts, earls, marquesses, dukes; among them, King Edward VI declared his cousin Lady Jane Grey "the Nine Days' Queen" to be his successor as Queen of England and Ireland, and she reigned from 10 July through 19 July 1553 by her right as the great-granddaughter of King Henry VII via her parents Henry Grey, 1st Duke of Suffolk and Mary Tudor, Queen of France, until she was deposed by her cousin Mary I of England. Notably, Prime Minister Charles Grey, 2nd Earl Grey abolished slavery in the British Empire in 1833.

Grey lineage

11th century

Anchetil de Greye (c. 1052 – after 1086) is listed in the Domesday Book as the lord of six Oxfordshire manors. His descendant Sir Henry de Grey was the first of the Anglo-Norman Grey family who were called to parliament, raised to the peerage, married into royalty, appointed army generals, and consecrated bishops, as well as later distinguishing themselves in other professions.

13th century

Reginald de Grey, 1st Baron Grey de Wilton (c. 1240–1308) was the son of Sir John de Grey and the namesake of one of the four Inns of Court, being Gray's Inn, which became of Reginald de Grey's Portpoole Manor. He was one of three commanders appointed by Edward I of England in his 1282 campaign against Llywelyn ap Gruffudd, the rebellious Prince of Wales.

14th century

John de Grey, 1st Baron Grey de Rotherfield (c. 1300–1359) is listed in the Bruges Garter Book as a founding knight of the Most Noble Order of the Garter and a companion of Edward the Black Prince. He was Lord Steward of the Royal Household of King Edward III.

16th century

Lady Jane Grey (c. 1537–1554) "the Nine Days' Queen" was the daughter of Henry Grey, 1st Duke of Suffolk and Queen of England and Ireland. Lady Jane was the great-granddaughter of King Henry VII through his daughter Mary Tudor, Queen of France. Due to this and her avowed Protestantism, King Edward VI nominated Lady Jane as his successor to the Crown. She thus became de facto Queen of England and Ireland on 10 July 1553, until her deposition on 19 July 1553 by Mary I of England.

19th century

Charles Grey, 2nd Earl Grey (c. 1764–1845) was the son of Charles Grey, 1st Earl Grey and Prime Minister of the United Kingdom. Lord Grey's government enacted the abolition of slavery in the British Empire by initiating the mass purchase of slaves from their owners in 1833. He had previously resigned as foreign secretary in 1807 to protest the King's uncompromising rejection of Catholic Emancipation. He is the namesake of Earl Grey tea.

20th century

Edward Grey, 1st Viscount Grey of Fallodon (c. 1862–1933) is Britain’s longest serving Secretary of State for Foreign Affairs (1905–1916). He was the main force behind British foreign policy in the era of World War I, the centrepiece of his foreign policy being the defence of France against German aggression, while avoiding a binding alliance with Paris. His most consequential achievement in foreign policy was otherwise securing the Anglo-Russian entente of 1907.

Family tree

Arms of the Greys

Bibliography

 William Dugdale, Baronage of England (London, 1675–76)
 Arthur Collins, Peerage of England (fifth edition, London, 1779)

See also
 Anchetil de Greye
 Sir Henry de Grey
 Sir John de Grey
 Reginald de Grey, 1st Baron Grey de Wilton (incl. Gray's Inn)
 John de Grey, 2nd Baron Grey de Rotherfield (incl. the Order of the Garter)
 Dame Elizabeth Grey 
 Henry Grey, 1st Duke of Suffolk
 Lady Jane Grey 
 Charles Grey, 1st Earl Grey
 Charles Grey, 2nd Earl Grey (incl. Grey's Monument and Earl Grey tea) 
 Edward Grey, 1st Viscount Grey of Fallodon
 Barons Grey (incl. the Barons Walsingham)

References

 
Grey
Grey
Noble families of the United Kingdom
Political families of the United Kingdom